The Roraima National Forest is a national forest in the state of Roraima, Brazil.

History

The Roraima National Forest and Amazonas National Forest were created by President José Sarney in 1989.
The Roraima National Forest  was created by decree nº 97545 of 1 March 1989 and covered  of the Amazon biome.
This had the effect of dividing the territory of the Yanomami people into several separate areas.
In 1990 three gold mining reserves were created within the Roraima National Forest.
The Yanomami Indigenous Territory was demarcated in 1992 in the lead up to the Earth Summit in Rio de Janeiro.
This was followed by a vigorous international campaign in support of the Yanomami people. 
The gold mines were closed and the miners removed.

In an indigenous territory the indigenous people have the exclusive right of use according to their customs and traditions.
Although technically the Roraima National Forest remained, exploitation of the forest would violate these rights.
However, in the mid-1990s two settlements, Samaúma and Vila Nova, had taken , leaving  unclaimed.
The resized national forest now excludes the indigenous territory.

Location

The Roraima National Forest is in the municipalities of Alto Alegre and Mucajaí of the state of Roraima.
It adjoins the Yanomami Indigenous Territory to the west.
The climate is tropical rainy in the eastern sector and tropical rainy monsoon on the west.

The terrain is undulating with hills that stand out from the surrounding land. 
The forest contains parts of the Mucajaí, Apiaú and Uraricoera sub-basins of the Branco River basin.
In the Mucajaí sub-basin there is small farming and extensive livestock raising.
There are also stretches of seasonal forest and dense rainforest in rugged terrain.
The Apiaú is a right tributary of the Mucajaí and delimits the southern boundary of the national forest where it meets the Yanomami Indigenous Territory.
A small part of the north of the national forest is in the Uraricoera basin, an area of extensive cattle ranching with some subsistence and semi-commercial farming.

Conservation

The Roraima National Forest is administered by the Federal Chico Mendes Institute for Biodiversity Conservation (ICMBio).
It is classed as IUCN protected area category IV (habitat/species management area), with the purpose of supporting sustainable multiple use of forest resources and scientific research, with emphasis on methods for sustainable exploitation of native forests.
The conservation unit would be included in the proposed Northern Amazon Ecological Corridor.

Notes

Sources

National forests of Brazil
Protected areas of Roraima
Amazon basin
1989 establishments in Brazil
Protected areas established in 1989